Anadia hollandi is a species of lizard in the family Gymnophthalmidae. It is endemic to Colombia.

References

Anadia (genus)
Reptiles of Colombia
Endemic fauna of Colombia
Reptiles described in 2022